The Chesebro Smith House on Broadway in Fargo, North Dakota was built in 1909.  It was listed on the National Register of Historic Places.  But it was delisted from the Register in 2004.

The house was "an outstanding example of a large Dutch Colonial Revival dwelling."

Properties delisted from the Register usually have had a building demolished or other severe loss of historic integrity.

References

Houses on the National Register of Historic Places in North Dakota
Colonial Revival architecture in North Dakota
Houses completed in 1909
Houses in Fargo, North Dakota
Former National Register of Historic Places in North Dakota
National Register of Historic Places in Cass County, North Dakota
Dutch Colonial Revival architecture in the United States
1909 establishments in North Dakota